Micromeria is a genus of flowering plants in the mint family, Lamiaceae, widespread across Europe, Asia, Africa, and North America, with a center of diversity in the Mediterranean region and the Canary Islands.   It is sometimes placed within the genus Satureja. The name is derived from the Greek words μῑκρος (mīkros), meaning "small," and μερίς (meris), meaning "portion," referring to the leaves and flowers.

Species
 Micromeria acropolitana Halácsy - Greece  (presumed extinct, rediscovered 2006)
 Micromeria albanica (K.Malý) Šilic - Albania, Yugoslavia
 Micromeria × angosturae P.Pérez Gran Canaria in the Canary Islands  (M. tenuis subsp. linkii × M. varia subsp. canariensis)
 Micromeria arganietorum (Emb.) R.Morales - Morocco
 Micromeria benthamii Webb & Berthel. - Gran Canaria in the Canary Islands
 Micromeria × benthamineolens Svent. - Gran Canaria in the Canary Islands  (M. benthamii × M. pineolens)
 Micromeria biflora (Buch.-Ham. ex D.Don) Benth. - Himalayas from Afghanistan to Myanmar (India, Pakistan, Nepal, Assam, Bhutan, Guizhou, Yunnan)
 Micromeria × bourlieri Maire & Le Lièvre - Algeria, Morocco    (M. graeca × M. inodora)
 Micromeria brivesii Batt. - Morocco
 Micromeria × broussonetii A.Santos, A.Acev.-Rodr. & Reyes-Bet. - Canary Islands  (M. densiflora × M. varia)
 Micromeria browiczii Ziel. & Kit Tan - Greece
 Micromeria chionistrae Meikle - Cyprus
 Micromeria conferta (Coss. & Daveau) Stefani - Libya
 Micromeria × confusa G.Kunkel & P.Pérez - Gran Canaria in the Canary Islands   (M. benthamii × M. lanata)
 Micromeria cremnophila Boiss. & Heldr. - Albania, Greece, Turkey, Syria, Lebanon 
 Micromeria cristata (Hampe) Griseb. - Albania, Greece, Yugoslavia, Turkey, Bulgaria, Iran, Cyprus
 Micromeria croatica (Pers.) Schott - Albania, Yugoslavia
 Micromeria cymuligera Boiss. & Hausskn. - Turkey
 Micromeria danaensis Danin - Jordan
 Micromeria debilis Pomel - Algeria, Morocco
 Micromeria densiflora Benth. - Tenerife in the Canary Islands   
 Micromeria elliptica K.Koch - Turkey
 Micromeria filiformis (Aiton) Benth. - Corsica, Sardinia, Balearic Islands
 Micromeria flacca (Nábelek) Hedge - Turkey, Iraq
 Micromeria flagellaris Baker - Madagascar
 Micromeria fontanesii Pomel - Algeria, Morocco
 Micromeria forbesii Benth. - Cape Verde Islands
 Micromeria fruticosa (L.) Druce - Eastern Mediterranean
 Micromeria glomerata P.Pérez - Tenerife in the Canary Islands   
 Micromeria graeca (L.) Benth. ex Rchb. - Mediterranean from Morocco + Portugal to Turkey
 Micromeria guichardii (Quézel & Zaffran) Brullo & Furnari - Libya
 Micromeria hedgei Rech.f. - Iran
 Micromeria helianthemifolia Webb & Berthel. - Gran Canaria in the Canary Islands
 Micromeria herpyllomorpha Webb & Berthel. - La Palma in the Canary Islands
 Micromeria hispida Boiss. & Heldr. ex Benth. - Crete
 Micromeria hochreutineri (Briq.) Maire - Algeria, Morocco
 Micromeria × hybrida Zagan - Greece including Crete   (M. graeca × M. nervosa)
 Micromeria hyssopifolia Webb & Berthel. - Tenerife + El Hierro in the Canary Islands
 Micromeria imbricata (Forssk.) C.Chr. - Africa from Nigeria to Ethiopia to Transvaal, Arabian Peninsula
 Micromeria inodora (Desf.) Benth. - Algeria, Morocco, Tunisia, Spain including Balearic Islands
 Micromeria × intermedia G.Kunkel & P.Pérez - Gran Canaria in the Canary Islands   (M. benthamii × M. helianthemifolia)
 Micromeria juliana (L.) Benth. ex Rchb. - Mediterranean 
 Micromeria kerneri Murb. - Yugoslavia
 Micromeria lachnophylla Webb & Berthel. - Tenerife in the Canary Islands   
 Micromeria lanata (C.Sm. ex Link) Benth. - Gran Canaria in the Canary Islands
 Micromeria lasiophylla Webb & Berthel. - Canary Islands   
 Micromeria lepida Webb & Berthel. La Gomera in the Canary Islands
 Micromeria leucantha Svent. ex P.Pérez - Gran Canaria in the Canary Islands
 Micromeria longipedunculata Bräuchler - Yugoslavia, Albania
 Micromeria macrosiphon Coss. - Morocco
 Micromeria madagascariensis Baker - Madagascar
 Micromeria marginata (Sm.) Chater - Alpes Maritimes in France, Liguria + Sardinia in Italy
 Micromeria × meteorica Hausskn. - Greece   (M. cremnophila × M. juliana)
 Micromeria microphylla (d'Urv.) Benth. - Balearic Islands, Sicily, Malta, southern mainland Italy, Crete, Cyprus, Libya
 Micromeria monantha (Font Quer) R.Morales - Morocco
 Micromeria myrtifolia Boiss. & Hohen. - from Greece to Iran
 Micromeria nervosa (Desf.) Benth. - Mediterranean from Algeria + Balearic Islands to Turkey
 Micromeria × nogalesii G.Kunkel & P.Pérez - Gran Canaria in the Canary Islands   (M. lanata × M. varia subsp. canariensis)
 Micromeria peltieri (Maire) R.Morales - Morocco
 Micromeria × perez-pazii G.Kunkel - Gran Canaria in the Canary Islands  (M. benthamii × M. tenuis)
 Micromeria persica Boiss. - Iran, Iraq, Turkey
 Micromeria pineolens Svent. - Gran Canaria in the Canary Islands  
 Micromeria × preauxii Webb & Berthel. - Gran Canaria in the Canary Islands  (M. benthamii × M. varia subsp. canariensis)
 Micromeria pseudocroatica Šilic - Yugoslavia
 Micromeria rivas-martinezii Wildpret - Tenerife in the Canary Islands   
 Micromeria serbaliana Danin & Hedge - Sinai
 Micromeria sinaica Benth. - Sinai, Israel
 Micromeria sphaciotica Boiss. & Heldr. ex Benth.- Crete
 Micromeria sphaerophylla Baker - Madagascar
 Micromeria suborbicularis (Alain) Borhidi - Cuba
 Micromeria × tagananensis P.Pérez - Tenerife in the Canary Islands   (M. glomerata × M. varia) 
 Micromeria teneriffae (Poir.) Benth. ex G.Don - Tenerife in the Canary Islands   
 Micromeria tenuis (Link) Webb & Berthel. - Gran Canaria in the Canary Islands  
 Micromeria unguentaria Schweinf. - Ethiopia
 Micromeria varia Benth. - Canary Islands, Madeira, Cape Verde Islands
 Micromeria weilleri (Maire) R.Morales - Morocco
 Micromeria × wildpretii P.Pérez - Tenerife in the Canary Islands  (M. rivas-martinezii × M. varia)

Formerly placed here
 Clinopodium bolivianum (Benth.) Kuntze (as M. boliviana Benth.)
 Clinopodium brownei (Sw.) Kuntze (as M. brownei (Sw.) Benth. and M. pilosiuscula  (A.Gray) Small)
 Clinopodium douglasii (Benth.) Kuntze. (as M. douglasii Benth.) 
 Mentha japonica (Miq.) Makino (as M. japonica Miq.)
 Mosla japonica (Oliv.) Maxim. (as M. perforata Miq.)

References

 The Plant List entry

External links

 
Lamiaceae genera
Taxonomy articles created by Polbot